Hermann Lungkwitz (1813–1891) was a 19th-century German-born Texas romantic landscape artist and photographer whose work became the first pictorial record of the Texas Hill Country.

Early life

Karl Friedrich Hermann Lungkwitz was born on March 14, 1813, in Halle, Saxony-Anhalt to hosiery manufacturer Johann Gottfried Lungkwitz and his wife Friederike Wilhelmine (Hecht) Lungkwitz.

Lungkwitz was enrolled at the Dresden Academy of Fine Arts  from 1840 to 1843 and received his artistic training under the tutelage of Adrian Ludwig Richter. After receiving an academy certificate of achievement in 1843 for his sketch of the Elbe River, Lungkwitz spent the next three years honing his artistic skills in Salzkammergut and the Northern Limestone Alps in Bavaria.

Lungkwitz and his brother-in-law Friedrich Richard Petri joined other students in the failed 1849 May Uprising in Dresden, an event at the tail end of the Revolutions of 1848 resulting from the refusal of Frederick Augustus II to recognize a constitutional monarchy.

Texas

In 1850, the Lungkwitz and Petri families emigrated to the United States, landing first in New York City.  They migrated to Wheeling, West Virginia, but decided on the destination of Texas in 1851.

In 1852, the two families bought a 320-acre farm for $400 in the settlement of Pedernales, Texas, near Fredericksburg and took up farming and cattle ranching.  The families remained there until 1864, although Petri drowned in the Pedernales River in 1857.  Lungkwitz continued to create paintings of the Texas Hill Country, one of his favorite subjects being Enchanted Rock, of which he painted at least six landscapes:

The artist created in great detail in both pencil drawings and paintings.  In addition to Gillespie County vistas, his Texas subjects were the German settlements of New Braunfels and Sisterdale, the Hamilton Pool and West Cave at Round Mountain, Marble Falls, and areas around Austin and San Antonio. From 1866–1870, Lungkwitz ran a San Antonio photography studio with Carl G. von Iwonski.

In 1870 he accepted an $1,800 a year appointment in Austin as photographer for the Texas General Land Office under commissioner Jacob Kuechler, brother-in-law to Friedrich Richard Petri.  He held the position for the entirety of the administration of Governor Edmund J. Davis.  His daughter Martha Lungkwitz Bickler also received an appointment as Texas General Land Office clerk in an era where few women worked in state government.  In 1877, Martha's husband Jacob Bickler founded the Texas German and English Academy in Austin, where Lungkwitz taught drawing and painting.  Bickler became superintendent of Galveston public schools in 1887, and also founded the Bickler Academy in Austin in 1892.  Lungkwitz gave private lessons at both Austin and Galveston whenever he visited the Bicklers.  In Blanco County, Lungkwitz assisted his daughter Eva and her husband Richard Klappenbach on their sheep ranch near Johnson City.

Personal life and death
Lungkwitz married Elisabeth "Elise" Petri, sister of Friedrich Richard Petri.  The couple had six children.  Elisabeth died in 1880 and is buried at the Oakwood Cemetery in Austin, Texas. Lungkwitz died in Austin on February 10, 1891, and is buried next to his wife.

Lungkwitz is the great-great-grandfather of American photographer Rocky Schenck.

Hermann Lungkwitz gallery
All works are oil paintings. Dates, dimensions, and collections unknown if not provided

Selected works
Sunset in Saxony (1846)
Old Pinta Crossing the Guadalupe (1857)
Crockett Street Looking West (1857)
Guadalupe River Landscape (1862)
Enchanted Rock, Near Fredericksburg (1864)
Texas Military Institute (1874)
Taylor's Lime Kiln (1875)
Paggi's Mill on Barton Creek, Austin (1876)

Notes

References

External links

UT-Austin Harry Ransom Center-Texas Artists—Art of the Western Frontier

19th-century German painters
19th-century American male artists
German male painters
19th-century American painters
American male painters
1813 births
1891 deaths
German emigrants to the United States
Artists from Texas
People from New Braunfels, Texas
People from Austin, Texas
Burials at Oakwood Cemetery (Austin, Texas)
German-American culture in Texas
People from Halle (Saale)
Painters from Texas